Gola is a municipality in the Koprivnica-Križevci County in Croatia. According to the 2011 census, there are 2,431 inhabitants in the area, with Croats forming an absolute majority.

History

In the late 19th century and early 20th century, Gola was part of the Bjelovar-Križevci County of the Kingdom of Croatia-Slavonia. Gola had a railway station on the Barcs - Nagykanizsa railway line (opened in 1868) in Hungarian territory. The use of the station for Gola district citizens was possible and were ruled under a special Hungarian - Yugoslav agreement until World War II. After the Cold War started, the access through the border was prohibited. The last train stopped at Gola station on 18 June 1951 at 3:50 p.m.(1, "[...]the last train is number 2407. For the train nr. 1401 Berzence station asks already Gyékényes station for permission.[...]") After 1956 even the station building was demolished.

Demographics
The population of the municipality broken down into villages according to the 2011 census is:
Gola - 885
Gotalovo - 344
Novačka - 381
Otočka - 238
Ždala - 583

References

Municipalities of Croatia
Populated places in Koprivnica-Križevci County
Croatia–Hungary border crossings